Marius Cihărean (born 17 November 1975) is a featherweight weightlifter from Romania. He competed at the 1996 Summer Olympics, and won a bronze medal at the 1996 European Championships. He still competes in the masters category. His elder brother Traian is also a former Olympic weightlifter.

References

1975 births
Living people
Olympic weightlifters of Romania
Romanian male weightlifters
Weightlifters at the 1996 Summer Olympics
European Weightlifting Championships medalists
20th-century Romanian people
21st-century Romanian people